Wantagh High School is a high school located in Wantagh, New York.  It contains grades 9–12.  It is part of the Wantagh Union Free School District.

Warrior mascot

In November of 2022, New York State’s education department acted to enforce a two-decade old memorandum urging public schools to drop Native American inspired mascots. Funding will be cut to schools that do not comply by the end of the 2022-2023 school year. Wantagh Senior High School, having a mascot inspired by Natives, must now decide upon a new mascot name.

Notable alumni
Rob Cesternino: reality television contestant and podcast host
Al Iaquinta: wrestler; professional MMA fighter in the UFC
Trent Kowalik – Tony Award-winning star of Billy Elliot the Musical.
John Mateer – Musician and filmmaker. Recorded viral video of destruction to his Wantagh home during Hurricane Sandy.
Lonny Ross – Actor/comedian (30 Rock); graduated from Wantagh High School in 1995.

References

External links

Deceased Alumni

Public high schools in New York (state)
Schools in Nassau County, New York